The 2022 New Smyrna Visitors Bureau 200 was an NASCAR Whelen Modified Tour race that was held on February 12, 2022. It was contested over 200 laps on the  short track. It was the first race of the 2022 NASCAR Whelen Modified Tour season. Matt Hirschman, driving for owner Roy Hall, collected his first victory of the season.

Report

Entry list 

 (R) denotes rookie driver.
 (i) denotes driver who is ineligible for series driver points.

Practice

Qualifying

Qualifying results

Race 

Laps: 200

Race statistics 

 Lead changes:  6
 Cautions/Laps: 5 for 31 laps
 Time of race: 1:36:07
 Average speed: 62.424 mph

References 

2022 NASCAR Whelen Modified Tour
New Smyrna Visitors Bureau 200
New Smyrna Visitors Bureau 200